Distocambarus is a genus of burrowing crayfish native to Georgia and South Carolina in the United States. It contains five species:

Distocambarus carlsoni (Hobbs, 1983) – Data deficient
Distocambarus crockeri (Hobbs & Carlson, 1983) – Data deficient
Distocambarus devexus (Hobbs, 1981) – Data deficient
Distocambarus hunteri (Fitzpatrick & Eversole, 1997) – Vulnerable
Distocambarus youngineri (Hobbs & Carlson, 1985) – Vulnerable

References

Cambaridae
Decapod genera
Taxa named by Horton H. Hobbs Jr.
Taxonomy articles created by Polbot